The Golden Archipelago is the sixth studio album by American indie rock band Shearwater. It was released on February 23, 2010, on the Matador Records label. The track "Black Eyes" is the first single from the album.

Shearwater released the album on both CD and vinyl. The first pressing of the CD includes a 50-page booklet with lyrics, as well as collected photographs from the "Golden Dossier," featuring images, maps and texts of island exploration themes.

Music
The album was produced by John Congleton and Shearwater.

Reception

The album has so far received moderately positive reviews, garnering an aggregate score of 74 out of 100 on Metacritic, based on 23 reviews. Some critics noted its softer sound, compared to the grandeur of previous albums like Rook and Palo Santo. Allmusic compared it to 1970s Peter Gabriel and Pink Floyd's The Final Cut, saying it lacked many of Rooks "more muscular moments."

Music critics also lauded Shearwater's commitment to the album format in the age of MP3s, making a cohesive, conceptual work of progressive rock, rather than simply a collection of singles.Pitchfork Review

Track listing
 "Meridian" – 3:37
 "Black Eyes" – 3:40
 "Landscape at Speed" – 4:33
 "Hidden Lakes" – 3:47
 "Corridors" – 2:46
 "God Made Me" – 4:23
 "Runners of the Sun" – 2:53
 "Castaways" – 3:16
 "An Insular Life" – 3:09
 "Uniforms" – 3:49
 "Missing Islands" – 2:18

Singles"Black Eyes"' (January 19, 2010)

External links
Shearwater's official site

References

2010 albums
Shearwater (band) albums
Albums produced by John Congleton
Albums recorded at Sonic Ranch